Club Deportivo Social y Cultural Real León is a Chilean Football club, their home town is Pedro Aguirre Cerda, Santiago, Chile.

The club were founded on February 2, 2009 and participated for 2 years in Tercera División B.

Seasons played
2 seasons in Tercera División B

See also
Chilean football league system

Football clubs in Chile
Association football clubs established in 2009
2009 establishments in Chile